The John von Neumann Theory Prize of the Institute for Operations Research and the Management Sciences (INFORMS)
is awarded annually to an individual (or sometimes a group) who has made fundamental and sustained contributions to theory in operations research and the management sciences.

The Prize named after mathematician John von Neumann is awarded for a body of work, rather than a single piece. The Prize was intended to reflect contributions that have stood the test of time. The criteria include significance, innovation, depth, and scientific excellence.

The award is $5,000, a medallion and a citation.

The Prize has been awarded since 1975. The first recipient was George B. Dantzig for his work on linear programming.

List of recipients 
 2022 Vijay Vazirani
 2021 Alexander Shapiro
 2020 Adrian Lewis
 2019 Dimitris Bertsimas and Jong-Shi Pang
 2018 Dimitri Bertsekas and John Tsitsiklis
 for contributions to Parallel and Distributed Computation as well as Neurodynamic Programming.
 2017 Donald Goldfarb and Jorge Nocedal
 for seminal contributions to the theory and applications of nonlinear optimization over the past several decades.
 2016  Martin I. Reiman and Ruth J. Williams
 for seminal research contributions over the past several decades, to the theory and applications of “stochastic networks/systems” and their “heavy traffic approximations.” 
 2015 Vašek Chvátal   and   Jean Bernard Lasserre
 for seminal and profound contributions to the theoretical foundations of optimization.
 2014 Nimrod Megiddo
  for fundamental contributions across a broad range of areas of operations research and management science, most notably in linear programming, combinatorial optimization, and algorithmic game theory.
 2013 Michel Balinski
 2012 George Nemhauser and Laurence Wolsey
 2011 Gérard Cornuéjols, IBM University Professor of Operations Research at Carnegie Mellon University's Tepper School of Business
 for his fundamental and broad contributions to discrete optimization including his deep research on balanced and ideal matrices, perfect graphs and cutting planes for mixed-integer optimization.
 2010 Søren Asmussen and Peter W. Glynn
 2009 Yurii Nesterov and Yinyu Ye
 2008 Frank Kelly
 2007 Arthur F. Veinott, Jr.
 for his profound contributions to three major areas of operations research and management science: inventory theory, dynamic programming and lattice programming.
 2006 Martin Grötschel, László Lovász and Alexander Schrijver
 for their fundamental path-breaking work in combinatorial optimization.
 2005 Robert J. Aumann
 in recognition of his fundamental contributions to game theory and related areas
 2004 J. Michael Harrison
 for his profound contributions to two major areas of operations research and management science: stochastic networks and mathematical finance.
 2003 Arkadi Nemirovski and Michael J. Todd
 for their seminal and profound contributions in continuous optimization.
 2002 Donald L. Iglehart and Cyrus Derman
 for their fundamental contributions to performance analysis and optimization of stochastic systems
 2001 Ward Whitt
 for his contributions to queueing theory, applied probability and stochastic modelling
 2000 Ellis L. Johnson and Manfred W. Padberg
 1999 R. Tyrrell Rockafellar
 1998 Fred W. Glover
 1997 Peter Whittle
 1996 Peter C. Fishburn
 1995 Egon Balas
 1994 Lajos Takacs
 1993 Robert Herman
 1992 Alan J. Hoffman and Philip Wolfe
 1991 Richard E. Barlow and Frank Proschan
 1990 Richard Karp
 1989 Harry M. Markowitz
 1988 Herbert A. Simon
 1987 Samuel Karlin
 1986 Kenneth J. Arrow
 1985 Jack Edmonds
 1984 Ralph Gomory
 1983 Herbert Scarf
 1982 Abraham Charnes, William W. Cooper, and Richard J. Duffin
 1981 Lloyd Shapley
 1980 David Gale, Harold W. Kuhn, and Albert W. Tucker
 1979 David Blackwell
 1978 John F. Nash and Carlton E. Lemke
 1977 Felix Pollaczek
 1976 Richard Bellman
 1975 George B. Dantzig for his work on linear programming

There is also an IEEE John von Neumann Medal awarded by the IEEE annually "for outstanding achievements in computer-related science and technology".

See also 
 IEEE John von Neumann Medal
 List of engineering awards
 List of mathematics awards
 Prizes named after people

References

External links 
 

Awards established in 1975

Systems sciences awards
Operations research awards